Kamer Daron Acemoğlu (born September 3, 1967) is a Turkish-born American economist who has taught at the Massachusetts Institute of Technology (MIT) since 1993. He is currently the Elizabeth and James Killian Professor of Economics at MIT. He was named Institute Professor in 2019.

Born to Armenian parents in Istanbul, Acemoglu completed his MSc and then PhD at the London School of Economics (LSE) at 25. He lectured at LSE for a year before joining the MIT. He was awarded the John Bates Clark Medal in 2005. Acemoglu is best known for his work on political economy. He has authored hundreds of papers, many of which are co-authored with his long-time collaborators Simon Johnson and James A. Robinson. With Robinson, he authored Economic Origins of Dictatorship and Democracy (2006) and Why Nations Fail (2012). The latter, an influential book on the role that institutions play in shaping nations' economic outcomes, prompted wide scholarly and media commentary. Described as a centrist, he believes in a regulated market economy. He regularly comments on political issues, economic inequality, and a variety of specific policies.

Acemoglu ranked third, behind Paul Krugman and Greg Mankiw, in the list of "Favorite Living Economists Under Age 60" in a 2011 survey among American economists. In 2015, he was named the most cited economist of the past 10 years per Research Papers in Economics (RePEc) data. According to the Open Syllabus Project, Acemoglu is the third most frequently cited author on college syllabi for economics courses after Mankiw and Krugman.

Life
Kamer Daron Acemoğlu was born in Istanbul, Turkey to Armenian parents on September 3, 1967. He is the only child of Kevork Acemoglu (1938−1988), a commercial lawyer and lecturer at Istanbul University, and Irma (d. 1991), principal of Aramyan Uncuyan, an Armenian school in Kadıköy district. He attended the Aramyan Uncuyan Armenian elementary school and graduated from Galatasaray High School in 1986. He became interested in politics and economics as a teenager. He earned his BA in economics at the University of York in 1989, his MSc in econometrics and mathematical economics and PhD in economics from the London School of Economics (LSE), in 1990 and 1992 respectively. His doctoral thesis was titled "Essays in Microfoundations of Macroeconomics: Contracts and Economic Performance." His doctoral advisor was Kevin W. S. Roberts. James Malcomson, one of his doctoral examiners at the LSE, said that even the weakest three of the seven chapters of his thesis were "more than sufficient for the award of a PhD." Arnold Kling called him a wunderkind due to his age of receiving a PhD; he became a Doctor at 25.

Acemoglu is a naturalized US citizen. He is fluent in English and Turkish, and speaks at least some Armenian. He is married to Asuman "Asu" Ozdağlar, a professor of Electrical Engineering and Computer Science at Massachusetts Institute of Technology (MIT) and daughter of İsmail Özdağlar, a former Turkish government minister. Together they have authored several articles. As of 2015, they live in Newton, Massachusetts with their two sons, Arda and Aras.

Academic career

Acemoglu was a lecturer in economics at the LSE from 1992 to 1993. He began lecturing at the MIT in 1993, when he was appointed assistant professor of economics. He was granted a tenure at MIT in 1998, and promoted to full professor in 2000. In 2004 he became Charles P. Kindleberger Professor of Applied Economics. Since 2010 Acemoglu has been the Elizabeth and James Killian Professor of Economics at MIT. In July 2019 he was named Institute Professor, the highest faculty honor at MIT.

As of mid-2019, he has had over 60 PhD students. Among his doctoral students are Robert Shimer, Mark Aguiar, Pol Antràs, and Gabriel Carroll. In 2014, he made $841,380, making him one of the top earners at MIT.

Acemoglu is a fellow of the United States National Academy of Sciences, American Academy of Arts and Sciences, Econometric Society, European Economic Association, and other learned societies. He is a research associate at the National Bureau of Economic Research, and a Senior Fellow at the Canadian Institute for Advanced Research. He was the editor of Econometrica, an academic journal published by the Econometric Society, from 2011 to 2015.

Acemoglu has authored hundreds of academic papers. He noted that most of his research has been "motivated by trying to understand the sources of poverty." His research includes a wide range of topics, including political economy, human capital theory, growth theory, economic development, innovation, labor economics, income and wage inequality, and network economics, among others. He noted in 2011 that most his research of the past 15 years concerned with what can be broadly called political economy. He has made contribution to the labor economics field.

Acemoglu has extensively collaborated with James A. Robinson, a British political scientist, since 1993. Acemoglu has described it as a "very productive relationship." They have worked together on a number of articles and several books, most of which on the subject of growth and economic development. The two have also extensively collaborated with economist Simon Johnson.

Research and publications
Acemoglu is a follower of new institutional economics. Among economists and sociologists who have influenced him are Joel Mokyr and Kenneth Sokoloff, Douglass North, Seymour Martin Lipset, Barrington Moore.

Books

Economic Origins of Dictatorship and Democracy
Published by Cambridge University Press in 2006, Economic Origins of Dictatorship and Democracy by Acemoglu and Robinson analyzes the creation and consolidation of democratic societies. They argue that "democracy consolidates when elites do not have strong incentive to overthrow it. These processes depend on (1) the strength of civil society, (2) the structure of political institutions, (3) the nature of political and economic crises, (4) the level of economic inequality, (5) the structure of the economy, and (6) the form and extent of globalization."

Romain Wacziarg praised the book and argued that its substantive contribution is the theoretical fusion of the Marxist dialectical materialism ("institutional change results from distributional struggles between two distinct social groups, a rich ruling class and a poor majority, each of whose interests are shaped primarily by economic forces") and the ideas of Barry Weingast and Douglass North, who argued that "institutional reform can be a way for the elite to credibly commit to future policies by delegating their enactment to interests that will not wish to reverse them." William Easterly called it "one of the most important contributions to the literature on the economics of democracy in a long time." Edward Glaeser described it as "enormously significant" work and a "great contribution to the field."

Why Nations Fail

In their 2012 book, Why Nations Fail, Acemoglu and Robinson argue that economic growth at the forefront of technology requires political stability, which the Mayan civilization (to name only one) did not have, and creative destruction.  The latter cannot occur without institutional restraints on the granting of monopoly and oligopoly rights.  They say that the industrial revolution began in Great Britain, because the English Bill of Rights 1689 created such restraints.  For example, a steam boat built in 1705 by Denis Papin was demolished by a boatmen guild in Münden, Germany.  Papin went to London, where several of his papers were published by the Royal Society.  Thomas Newcomen extended Papin's work into a steam engines in 1712, and became a commercial success, while Papin died in 1713 and was buried in an unmarked pauper's grave.

Acemoglu and Robinson insist that "development differences across countries are exclusively due to differences in political and economic institutions, and reject other theories that attribute some of the differences to culture, weather, geography or lack of knowledge about the best policies and practices."  For example, "Soviet Russia generated rapid growth as it caught up rapidly with some of the advanced technologies in the world [but] was running out of steam by the 1970s" because of a lack of creative destruction.

The book was written for the general audience.  It was widely discussed by political analysts and commentators. Warren Bass wrote of it in The Washington Post: "bracing, garrulous, wildly ambitious and ultimately hopeful. It may, in fact, be a bit of a masterpiece."

Clive Crook wrote in Bloomberg News that the book deserves most of the "lavish praise" it received. In his review in Foreign Affairs Jeffrey Sachs criticized Acemoglu and Robinson for systematically ignoring factors such as domestic politics, geopolitics, technological discoveries, and natural resources. He also argued that the book's appeal was based on readers' desire to hear that "Western democracy pays off not only politically but also economically." Bill Gates called the book a "major disappointment" and characterized the authors' analysis as "vague and simplistic." Ryan Avent, an editor at The Economist, responded that "Acemoglu and Robinson might not be entirely right about why nations succeed or fail. But at least they're engaged with the right problem."

Papers
Social programs and policies
In a 2001 article, Acemoglu argued that the minimum wage and unemployment benefits "shift the composition of employment toward high-wage jobs. Because the composition of jobs in the laissez-faire equilibrium is inefficiently biased toward low-wage jobs, these labor market regulations increase average labor productivity and may improve welfare." Furthermore, he has argued that "minimum wages can increase training of affected workers, by inducing firms to train their unskilled employees."

Democracy and economy
Acemoglu et al. found that "democracy has a significant and robust positive effect on GDP" and suggest that "democratizations increase GDP per capita by about 20% in the long run." In another paper, Acemoglu et al. found that "there is a significant and robust effect of democracy on tax revenues as a fraction of GDP, but no robust impact on inequality."

Social democracy and unions
Acemoglu and Philippe Aghion argued in 2001 that although deunionization in the US and UK since the 1980s is not the "underlying cause of the increase in inequality", it "amplifies the direct effect of skill-biased technical change by removing the wage compression imposed by unions."

According to Acemoglu and Robinson, unions historically had a significant role in creating democracy, especially in western Europe, and in maintaining a balance of political power between established business interests and political elites.

Nordic model
In a 2012 paper titled "Can't We All Be More Like Scandinavians?", co-written with Robinson and Verdier, he suggests that "it may be precisely the more 'cutthroat' American society that makes possible the more 'cuddly' Scandinavian societies based on a comprehensive social safety net, the welfare state and more limited inequality." They concluded that "all countries may want to be like the 'Scandinavians' with a more extensive safety net and a more egalitarian structure," however, if the United States shifted from being a "cutthroat [capitalism] leader", the economic growth of the entire world would be reduced. He argued against the US adopting the Nordic model in a 2015 op-ed for The New York Times. He again argued: "If the US increased taxation to Denmark levels, it would reduce rewards for entrepreneurship, with negative consequences for growth and prosperity." He praised the Scandinavian experience in poverty reduction, creation of a level playing field for its citizens, and higher social mobility. This was critiqued by Lane Kenworthy, who argues that, empirically, the US's economic growth preceded the divergence in cutthroat and cuddly policies, and there is no relationship between inequality and innovation for developed countries.

Colonialism
"The Colonial Origins of Comparative Development", co-written by Acemoglu, Robinson, and Simon Johnson in 2001, is by far his most cited work. Graham Mallard described it as an "excellent example of his work: an influential paper that has led to much debate." They argue that Europeans set up extractive institutions in colonies where they did not settle, unlike in places where they did settle and that these institutions have persisted. They estimated that "differences in institutions explain approximately three-quarters of the income per capita differences across former colonies." Historical experience dominated by extractive institutions in these countries has created a vicious circle, which was exacerbated by the European colonization.

Views
Journalists and economists have described Acemoglu as a centrist. Why Nations Fail was well received by liberal and conservative economists. Acemoglu's and Robinson's long-time collaborator Simon Johnson suggests that their "point is not just about how things may become awful when the government goes off track (a right-wing point). They are also more deeply concerned about how powerful people fight to grab control of the state and otherwise compete to exert influence over the rest of society (a left-wing perspective)."

Acemoglu has praised the successes of the Progressive Era, and argued in favor of its replication. Acemoglu argues that the market economy is the only system that creates prosperity. He believes in finding an appropriate balance between "incentivizing creativity, hard work and risk-taking and creating the essential public services, social safety nets and equality of opportunity." For Acemoglu, markets work only with regulations and predictable laws and that all markets are regulated to some extent; it is only a matter of degree. He suggests that free markets are not unregulated markets.

Wall Street
In September 2008, Acemoglu signed a petition condemning the Bush administration's bailout plan of the U.S. financial system. As the main cause of the financial crisis of 2007–2008, he stated that policy makers were "lured by ideological notions derived from Ayn Rand’s novels rather than economic theory" and opined: "In hindsight, we should not be surprised that unregulated profit-seeking individuals have taken risks from which they benefit and others lose." In an early analysis of the Great Recession, Acemoglu wrote: "When channeled into profit-maximizing, competitive, and innovative behavior under the auspices of sound laws and regulations, greed can act as the engine of innovation and economic growth. But when unchecked by the appropriate institutions and regulations, it will degenerate into rent-seeking, corruption, and crime." He argues that the heavy overrepresentation from the financial sector in the top 1% "has been an outcome of the political processes that have removed all of the regulations in finance, and so created the platform for 40 percent of U.S. corporate profits to be in the financial sector." He argues that a platform, particularly in Wall Street, has been created "where the ambition and greed of people, often men, has been channeled in a very anti-social, selfish and socially destructive direction."

Inequality
Acemoglu has voiced concerns regarding the increasing inequality in the US, which in his view turns into political inequality, in turn undermining the inclusiveness of US institutions. In 2012 he identified societal polarization, caused by economic inequality, as the biggest problem for the US. He argues that "democracy ceases to function because some people have so much money they command greater power." He states that he is comfortable with economic inequality which comes through different social contributions as it is a "price that we pay for providing incentives for people to contribute to prosperity." However, high levels of inequality create problems as the rich who control significant portions of the societal resources use them to create an "unequal distribution of political power." He sees the solution in increasing social mobility by "providing an opportunity for the bottom to become rich, not forcing the rich to become poor."

Acemoglu has praised the American tradition of vibrant protest movements dating back to the Populists and the Progressives. He has also praised Occupy Wall Street for "putting the question of inequality on the agenda, but also for actually standing up for political equality." He notes that Occupy Wall Street brought the 1% to the attention of the wider public, academic attention was brought by Tony Atkinson, Thomas Piketty, and Emmanuel Saez.

Specific policies
Acemoglu is in favor of raising and indexing the minimum wage.

Acemoglu believes that universal basic income is "expensive and not generous enough" and that a "more efficient and generous social safety net is needed." He further called it a "flawed idea" and a "poorly designed policy." He instead advocates for a "guaranteed-income program would offer transfers only to individuals whose monthly income is below $1,000, thereby coming in at a mere fraction of a UBI's cost." He calls for "universal health care, more generous unemployment benefits, better-designed retraining programs, and an expanded earned income tax credit (EITC)."

Acemoglu believes that nation-building by the West is no longer possible around the world because the West now lacks the resources and commitment that were present in post-World War II Germany and Japan, and because countries, such as in the Muslim- and Arab-majority countries, where such work is required today do not trust the West. He views the US war on drugs as a "total and very costly failure", and supported the 2013 ballot referendum Colorado Amendment 64, a successful popular initiative that legalized the sale of recreational marijuana.

In a 2016 interview with NPR, he opined that the US infrastructure is in a "pitiful state, with negative consequences for US economic growth."

Socialism, communism, and Marxism
Acemoglu argues that socialist states have not been successful in creating prosperity. He wrote that socialist regimes "from Cuba to the eastern bloc have been disastrous both for economic prosperity and individual freedom."

In a review written with James A. Robinson, he argues that Thomas Piketty and Karl Marx are "led astray" due to their disregard for "the key forces shaping how an economy functions: the endogenous evolution of technology and of the institutions and the political equilibrium that influence not only technology but also how markets function and how the gains from various different economic arrangements are distributed."

Social democracy and unions
In 2019, Acemoglu argued in favor of social democracy. He stated: "[Social democracy, when practiced by competent governments] is a phenomenal success. Everywhere in the west is to some degree social democratic, but the extent of this varies. We owe our prosperity and freedom to social democracy. ... [Social democracy] did not achieve these things by taxing and redistributing a lot. It achieved them by having labor institutions protecting workers, encouraging job creation and encouraging high wages." Acemoglu also noted that the economists of US presidential candidate Bernie Sanders, who is an advocate of democratic socialism along the lines of social democratic Nordic model, "don't understand basic economics. They are not just dangerous, they are clueless."

Acemoglu argued that a "tradition of strong labor movement or social democratic party, by constraining the actions of the social planner, can act as a commitment device to egalitarianism, inducing an equilibrium in which the country in question becomes the beneficiary from the asymmetric world equilibrium."

Donald Trump
In an op-ed in Foreign Policy, Acemoglu claimed that President Donald Trump shared political goals and strategies of Hugo Chávez, Vladimir Putin, and Recep Tayyip Erdoğan, such as "little respect for the rule of law or the independence of state institutions, ... a blurred vision of national and personal interests, ... little patience with criticism and a long-established strategy of rewarding loyalty, which can be seen in his high-level appointments to date. This is all topped by an unwavering belief in his abilities." In a 2019 interview with Der Spiegel, Acemoglu stated that he sees similarities between Trump and the Republican Party and the Nazis: "Surely, Trump and the Republicans are no Nazis. But they are exploiting the same political sentiment." He argues that Trump "poses a great risk to U.S. democracy" because he is "looking for a new order with elements of anti-liberalism, misinformation and a lax attitude to corruption. If he is re-elected next year, it will be the beginning of the end of American democracy."

Authoritarian countries
According to Acemoglu, the three obstacles for economic growth under authoritarian regimes are the tendency of authoritarian regimes to become more authoritarian, their tendency to use power to halt "Schumpeterian creative destruction, which is key to sustaining growth" and the instability and uncertainty caused by internal conflicts. He believes that Saudi Arabia would be like a poor African country without the oil, while the "only thing that is keeping [Russia] going is a big boom in natural resources and a clever handling of the media."

He believes that China has managed to achieve significant economic growth because it "sort of picked up the low hanging fruit from the world technology frontier, but that sort of growth is not going to last until China goes to the next step, which is harnessing innovation," which he argues will be impossible "unless economic institutions become even more open and the extractive political institutions in China will be a barrier to that." He and Robinson wrote for the HuffPost that the "limited rights [China] affords its citizens places major restrictions on the country’s longer-term possibilities for prosperity."

Turkey
Acemoglu opined that the Republic of Turkey, formed in 1923 by Atatürk, "is very continuous with the Ottoman Empire." Although the shift from empire to republic brought some positive changes, he argues, the model was largely maintained by the reformers who took power, citing a persistent concentration of power and economic activity. He suggests that the Republican period has been characterized by an unwillingness to accept ethnic minorities. In 2014, Acemoglu condemned the widespread anti-Armenian rhetoric in Turkish textbooks, and demanded that the books be pulled from circulation.

Acemoglu has criticized Recep Tayyip Erdoğan and his government for its authoritarian rule. In a 2013 op-ed in The New York Times, following the crackdown of Gezi Park protests, Acemoglu wrote that "Even before the brutal suppression of the demonstrations, the belief that Turkey was on its way to becoming a mature democracy — a role model for the rest of the Middle East — had already become untenable." In a May 2014 op-ed in Foreign Affairs, Acemoglu wrote that the drift from democracy by Erdogan is lamentable, but an "almost predictable, stage of Turkey’s democratic transition." In the late 2010s, Acemoglu often criticized Turkey's economic policies and consequently became popular with the opposition.

Armenia
Acemoglu, an ethnic Armenian, stated in a 2015 interview with the Armenian service of Voice of America, that he has always been interested in economic, political, and social developments in Armenia. Talking via video, Acemoglu partook in the Armenian Economic Association's annual conference in October 2013 held at the Yerevan State University, during which he argued that Armenia's problem is political, and not geographic, cultural, or geopolitical. He called for the Armenian government to be "more responsive to the wishes of its citizens so that through that political process Armenia ceases to be an oligarchy." In a September 2016 conference in Toronto Acemoglu criticized the Armenian diaspora for legitimizing the successive governments in Armenia, especially when the rights of its citizens are violated and a wrong economic and political line is being followed for the country. In an April 2017 conference held by the USC Institute of Armenian Studies, Acemoglu stated that while "Armenia could have looked much more like the Czech Republic or Estonia and what we got instead is a country that looks much more like Azerbaijan or Uzbekistan, which is a real shame." He suggested that in the immediate post-Soviet years Armenia was "stronger and it's been getting worse and worse." He criticized the level of corruption of the government, which has systematically closed the political system.

Other countries
In an op-ed for The Globe and Mail following the 2014 Ukrainian revolution, Acemoglu advocated Ukraine "to break with its past as quickly as possible. It needs to move away from Russia, politically and economically, even if that means an end to the natural-gas subsidies Russia has used to keep it in the position of a client state. Even more important is for Ukraine’s leaders to spread political power and economic benefits to the maximum number of its people, including Russian speakers."

Acemoglu argued that the Greek government-debt crisis was caused by the "terrible state of Greek institutions, and the clientelistic nature of its politics", and stated that the country's problems are "political not just macroeconomic." He identified lack of political integration within the EU as Greece's problem and that "the only way forward for Europe is to have greater fiscal and banking integration or to abandon monetary integration."

Political involvement

Turkey

In March 2011, Acemoglu was offered by Foreign Minister Ahmet Davutoğlu to become Turkey's permanent representative to the OECD in Paris, which he rejected in order to continue his academic career. It was seen in Armenia as a politically motivated move to earn "political dividends" on Armenian issues.

Acemoglu met with Kemal Kılıçdaroğlu, leader of the opposition Republican People's Party (CHP) in October 2022. In December 2022 Kılıçdaroğlu appointed Acemoglu, among others, as his economic adviser. Pro-Erdogan circles criticized the move. One pro-government columnist said: "The Armenian Daron Acemoğlu, praised by FETÖ, prepared Kılıçdaroğlu's vision program, (resembling his own roots)." In response, finance professor Özgür Demirtaş defended Acemoglu. "This tweet is both racist and presumptuous. The influence of Daron Acemoğlu on world’s economy-finance professors is greater than the number of cells in your body. It's terrible that you talk like this about a professor who made us proud and is going for the Nobel prize." Yeni Şafak, a pro-government newspaper, ran the headline: "Daron Acemoğlu, one of the new economic advisors of the CHP, could not solve the economic crisis of Armenia."

Armenia
Following the 2018 Armenian revolution, opposition leader-turned-Prime Minister Nikol Pashinyan wrote on his Facebook page that Acemoglu told him that he is ready to help Armenia to "restore and develop" its economy. Pashinyan and Acemoglu talked via the internet in June 2018. Acemoglu met with Deputy Prime Minister Tigran Avinyan in Boston in July 2019.

Recognition
According to data collected by Research Papers in Economics (RePEc), Acemoglu was the most cited economist of the decade leading to 2015. According to Google Scholar, his works (including co-authored works) have been cited more than 200,000 times as of January 2023. He was listed 88th in Foreign Policy'''s 2010 list of Top 100 Global Thinkers "for showing that freedom is about more than markets." In a 2011 survey of 299 economics professors in the U.S. Acemoglu ranked third, behind Paul Krugman and Greg Mankiw, in the list of "Favorite Living Economists Under Age 60".

Francis Fukuyama has described Acemoglu and his long-time collaborator James A. Robinson as "two of the world's leading experts on development." Clement Douglas wrote in the Federal Reserve Bank of Minneapolis publication that the "scope, depth and sheer volume of [his] scholarship are nothing short of breathtaking, verging on implausible." Angus Deaton called him a "young superstar" and noted that Acemoglu is "a very good example of the way things ought to be going, which is you do history but you know enough mathematics to be able to model it too."

Acemoglu is widely considered a prospective Nobel laureate in Economics.

Awards
Economics awards
John Bates Clark Medal (2005) by the American Economic Association
John von Neumann Award (2007) by Rajk László College for Advanced Studies
Erwin Plein Nemmers Prize in Economics (2012) by Northwestern University "for fundamental contributions to the understanding of political institutions, technical change and economic growth"
BBVA Foundation Frontiers of Knowledge Award (2016) "for proving the influence of institutions over economic development"
Jean-Jacques Laffont Prize, Toulouse School of Economics (2018)
Global Economy Prize, Kiel Institute for the World Economy (2019)
Corresponding Fellow of the British Academy (2021)

State orders and awards
Presidential Culture and Arts Grand Award in Social Sciences (2013) by Turkish President Abdullah Gül

Honorary degrees
Acemoglu has been awarded honorary degrees from the following universities: Utrecht University (2008), Bosporus University (2011), Bilkent University (2015), University of Bath (2017), ENS Paris-Saclay (2017), London Business School (2018), Boğaziçi University, and the University of Athens.

Other
Carnegie Fellow (2017)

Selected bibliography

Acemoglu, Daron; Laibson, David and List, John (2014). Principles of Economics, Pearson, New York.''
 Description,  arrow-searchable preview, & reviewers' comments (at bottom).

References

Notes

Citations

Sources

1967 births
Living people
Labor economists
New institutional economists
Economics journal editors
21st-century American economists
21st-century Turkish economists
21st-century American non-fiction writers
Turkish non-fiction writers
Writers from Istanbul
MIT School of Humanities, Arts, and Social Sciences faculty
Galatasaray High School alumni
Alumni of the London School of Economics
Academics of the London School of Economics
Alumni of the University of York
Fellows of the American Academy of Arts and Sciences
Fellows of the Econometric Society
Members of the United States National Academy of Sciences
Nancy L. Schwartz Memorial Lecture speakers
Fellows of the European Economic Association
American people of Armenian descent
American academics of Turkish descent
Turkish people of Armenian descent
Turkish emigrants to the United States